Robert D. Freeman (November 20, 1921 – December 17, 2001) was an American politician. He was a member of the Ohio Senate from 1975 to 1978, and represented the 29th district.

Freeman was often known as "Sunshine Bob". A Democrat, he was active in Canton area politics for over three decades. He died in 2001 after being involved in an automobile accident.

Has grandchildren in Michael Freeman II, Erin Freeman and Robert Freeman aka "bobo".

References

1921 births
Democratic Party Ohio state senators
Politicians from Canton, Ohio
2001 deaths
20th-century American politicians